A Bestiary Of is a compilation album by the Creatures (aka singer Siouxsie and musician Budgie), issued on CD in 1997. It compiled remastered recordings made by the band between 1981 and 1983, including the Wild Things EP, the Feast album, the B-side of "Miss the Girl" and the "Right Now" single (backed by "Weathercade").

Track listing
All tracks by Siouxsie and Budgie except "Right Now" written by Herbie Mann and Carl Sigman

References

The Creatures albums
1997 compilation albums
Polydor Records compilation albums